The Cambridge Journal of International and Comparative Law is an  open access double blind peer-reviewed journal, published under a  Creative Commons Attribution 3.0   License.

The Journal was launched on 25 October 2011 at the Lauterpacht Centre for International Law in Cambridge by its inaugural Editors-in-Chief and Professor James Crawford SC, who called it  "a useful complement to Cambridge Studies in International and Comparative Law [published by Cambridge University Press", as both fall well within the Cambridge ethos of trying to look into international law from a broad perspective". The journal is run and edited by students at the University of Cambridge but receives assistance from an  Academic Review Board  It is the second Journal of the Faculty of Law at the University (the other one being the  Cambridge Law Journal ) and one of the very few open access double blind peer review journals on international and comparative law. The CJICL is entering its third year of operation in the 2013-14 academic year, with 56 members on its editorial board.

The Journal publishes articles, case notes and book reviews on international law, comparative law, EU law and transnational law in four issues throughout the year (two regular issues, a compendium of conference papers from the CJICL conference and the UK Supreme Court Review – the latter is compiled by the editorial staff of the Journal and analyses the work of the UKSC in the previous judicial year). It also runs an online blog, which publishes short articles on topical international and comparative law issues. The CJICL holds an annual conference on International law.

History 

Since its establishment in 2011, the journal has published three issues in its first volume, and four issues in the second volume, which addressed a range of topics including international law and dispute settlement, EU Law, human rights and comparative law providing a platform for both young and well-established academics to engage in dialogue with each other through publications in the journal. The journal has a double-blind peer-review process with an academic review board of eminent scholars in the field of International and Comparative Law.  In its first two volumes, the journal has published a number of articles by prominent academics, established practitioners and pre-eminent judges, including Sir Christopher Greenwood of the International Court of Justice.

The senior treasurer of the journal is Professor James Crawford A.C. S.C. and the current editors-in-chief are Daniel Clarry, Valentin Jeutner and Cameron Miles.

CJICL Annual Conference 

The journal hosts an International and Comparative Law Conference annually at Cambridge, usually at St John’s Divinity School. The first Conference   discussed the theme "Agents of Change: The Individual as a Participant in the Legal Process" and was attended by about. 110 participants from all over the world - Europe, the Americas, Asia, Africa and Australia – and at all stages in their academic career: from graduate students and young academics to established professors and practitioners.
The second annual conference was held in May, 2013 on the theme of "Legal Tradition in a Diverse World", which saw ca. 150 participants presenting over 50 papers  and included a key note address by Judge Yusuf of the International Court of Justice, a key note debate between Professors James Crawford and Alain Pellet chaired by Professor Catherine Redgwell and a key note lecture by Professor H. Patrick Glenn.

UK Supreme Court Review 

The journal publishes an annual special issue, the 'UK Supreme Court Review' that   examines the decisions of the UK Supreme Court from the preceding judicial year. It is the only journal to produce a full issue review of the previous three terms of the work of the UK Supreme Court. I  The past two issues of the UK Supreme Court Review have featured articles from judges of the highest appellate courts internationally, including, Lord Phillips of Worth Matravers (formerly the President of the UK Supreme Court), Justice Marie Deschamps of the Supreme Court of Canada, Justice Hayne of the High Court of Australia, and Justice Gummow (formerly of the High Court of Australia).

CJICL Online 

The journal also maintains an online platform (called CJICL Online) which aims to provide a forum for discussion of on-going legal affairs related to the subject. Two blog posts on the site gained particular popularity when Julian Assange (who mistakenly believed their texts were related to the Cambridge Law Journal) cited them in an interview with the BBC.

References

External links
  Journal web site

British law journals
Comparative law journals
International law journals